The Canadian Air Transport Security Authority (CATSA) is the Canadian Crown Corporation responsible for security screening of people and baggage and the administration of identity cards at the 89 designated airports in Canada. CATSA responds to Transport Canada and reports to the Government of Canada through the Minister of Transport.

The federal budget presented on March 19, 2019 included a reference to the possibility of privatizing CATSA. On June 21, 2019, Parliament passed the Security Screening Services Commercialization Act, which allows the Governor-in-Council to designate a private not-for-profit corporation as the designated screening authority to take over and privatize the screening duties of CATSA. However, as a result of COVID-19, the privatization plans have been delayed with no clear timeline for discussions to resume.

Constitution
The Canadian Air Transport Security Authority was officially formed April 1, 2002, following the terrorist attacks on September 11, 2001 in the United States. After September 11, 2001, the Government of Canada took responsibility for airport screening which, until then, was the responsibility of the airlines as per direction from Transport Canada. The Canadian Air Transport Security Authority Act (Budget Implementation Act, 2001) provides additional security requirements as prescribed under the Aeronautics Act.

CATSA shares responsibility for civil aviation security with several federal government departments and agencies, air carriers and airport operators. Transport Canada is Canada's designated national civil aviation security regulator, under the standards established by the International Civil Aviation Organization (ICAO).

CATSA contracts screening services to private security companies. There were 5,747 active screening personnel across Canada in 2020–2021, and 7 million passengers screened. Passenger levels in 2020–2021 were significantly lower than usual due to the COVID-19 pandemic.

Controversy

CATSA has been implicated by the Privacy Commissioner of Canada for collecting non-aviation security information from the travelling public. For example, a domestic traveller with large sums of cash (not illegal) was reported by CATSA to the local police. Of the 10,400 reported incidents in CATSA's databases at the time of the audit, more than half had nothing to do with aviation security.

Former heads of CATSA

Past heads of CATSA have had law enforcement background. Both Duchesneau and McGarr served with the Montreal Urban Community Police Service (SPCUM). Watt is a former Canadian Forces officer and once Commander of the Royal Canadian Air Force.

 Jacques Duchesneau, 2002–2008
 Kevin McGarr, 2008–2012
 Angus Watt, 2012–2017
 Michael Saunders, 2017–present

See also
 Canadian Air Carrier Protection Program
 Transportation Security Administration

References

External links
 Canadian Air Transport Security Authority (CATSA)

Canadian federal Crown corporations
Federal departments and agencies of Canada
Aviation security
Aviation in Canada
Government agencies established in 2002
Transport Canada
2002 establishments in Ontario